Südliches Saaletal is a Verwaltungsgemeinschaft ("collective municipality") in the district Saale-Holzland, in Thuringia, Germany. The seat of the Verwaltungsgemeinschaft is in Kahla, itself not part of the Verwaltungsgemeinschaft.

The Verwaltungsgemeinschaft Südliches Saaletal consists of the following municipalities:

References

Verwaltungsgemeinschaften in Thuringia